Loraine M. Heiser (April 20, 1928 – September 21, 2014) was a Republican member of the Pennsylvania House of Representatives.

References

Republican Party members of the Pennsylvania House of Representatives
Women state legislators in Pennsylvania
1928 births
2014 deaths
21st-century American women